Inya (İyin) is a rural locality (a selo) in Ininskoye Rural Settlement of Ongudaysky District, the Altai Republic, Russia. The population was 730 as of 2016.

Geography 
Inya is located on the right bank of the Katun River, 68 km southeast of Onguday (the district's administrative centre) by road. Malaya Inya is the nearest rural locality.

References 

Rural localities in Ongudaysky District